Central Railway (abbreviated CR) is one of the 19 zones of Indian Railways. Its headquarters is in Mumbai at Chhatrapati Shivaji Maharaj Terminus.

History 
The railway zone was formed on 5 November 1951 by grouping several government-owned railways, including the Great Indian Peninsula Railway, the Scindia State Railway of the former princely state of Gwalior, Nizam State Railway, Wardha Coal State Railway and the Dholpur State Railway.

The Central Railway zone formerly included large parts of Madhya Pradesh and part of southern Uttar Pradesh, which made it the largest railway zone in India in terms of area, track mileage and staff. These areas became the new West Central Railway zone in April 2003.

The Central Railway General Manager's official residence (erstwhile GIPR agent's residence), 'Glenogle'-a Grade II-B heritage bungalow, is located on Bhausaheb Hire Marg (Mount Pleasant Road), adjacent to the Maharashtra Chief minister's official residence 'Varsha' in Malabar Hill, Mumbai.

Routes

Main/Long Routes of Central Railway 
 Mumbai CSMT-Kalyan-Igatpuri-Nashik road-Manmad-Jalgaon-Bhusawal-Akola-Badnera-Wardha-Nagpur
 Mumbai CSMT-Kalyan-Karjat-Lonavala-Pune
 Mumbai CSMT-Kurla-Vashi-Panvel-Roha
 Manmad-Aurangabad-Nanded (south central railway line)
 Pune-Daund-Solapur-Wadi-Tandur
 Pune-Satara-Sangli-Miraj-Kolhapur
 Miraj-Pandharpur-Kurduvadi-Barshi-Osmanabad-Latur-Latur Road
 Ballarshah-Majri-Sevagram (formerly Wardha East Jn.)-Nagpur-Amla-Itarsi
 Dadar-Solapur-Dadar

One of the oldest and important railway project of central railway zone was Kalyan-Ahmednagar railway project which was in planning stage since British regime. It was referred to as 3rd ghat project. A survey was carried out in 1973, 2000, 2006, 2014 etc, and the project was in the Railways Board pink book in 2010 but unfortunately the project was not started. The alignment length of this project was 184 km and it could have been shortest route for Marathwada, Andhra and Telangana. The major challenge for this project is 18.96 km long tunnel in Malshej Ghat section.
Malshej Kriti samiti is following for Kalyan-Ahmednagar railway project. Kalyan-Murbad section which is first phase of this project is already under survey stage.

Branch/Short routes of Central Railway 

 Mumbai CSMT-Wadala Road-Bandra-Goregaon
 Thane-Vashi-Panvel
 Daund-Manmad
 Bhusawal-Khandwa
 Amravati-Narkher
 Vasai Road-Diva-Panvel
 Panvel-Karjat
 Badnera-Amravati
 Daund-Baramati
 Puntamba-Shirdi
 Chalisgaon-Dhule
 Pachora-Jamner (NG)
 Pulgaon-Arvi (NG)
 Murtijapur-Yavatmal (NG)
 Murtijapur-Achalapur (NG)
 Jalamb-Khamgaon
 Majri jn-Pimpalkutti
 Neral-Matheran

Utilization

High 
 Mumbai-Thane-Kalyan-Karjat/Kasara sub-urban section
 Mumbai-Bhusawal-Akola-Nagpur
 Mumbai-Bhusawal-Khandwa
 Itarsi-Nagpur-Sevagram-Majri-Balharshah
 Mumbai-Pune-Daund-Solapur-Kalaburgi-Wadi
 Mumbai-Pune-Miraj-Hubli-Bengaluru-Chennai
 Daund-Ahmednagar-Manmad

Low 
 Puntamba-Sai nagar Shirdi
 Miraj-Kurduwadi
 Latur-Kurduwadi

Connections
Central railway zone connects to other Zones of Indian railways as at:

Western Railway Zone 
Bandra, Andheri, Goregaon, Dadar, Vasai Road

Konkan Railway Zone 
 Roha

South Central Railway zone

Secunderabad railway division 
 Balharshah
 Latur Road

Guntakal Railway Division 
Wadi Jn

Nanded railway division 
 Pimpalkutti
 Akola Jn
 Khandwa Jn
 Ankai Jn (MMR-AWB-PBN-NED route)

South East Central Railway zone

Nagpur SEC railway division 
 Nagpur Jn
 Chhindwara Jn

South Western Railway zone

Hubballi railway division 
 Hotgi Jn - For Pune-Solapur-Vijayapura-Gadag line.
 Miraj Jn - For Pune -Miraj-Londa-Bangalore line

Western Central Railway zone

Bhopal division 
 Itarsi Jn
 Khandwa Jn

Matheran Hill Railway 
Constructed in 1907, the narrow-gauge Matheran Hill Railway connects Neral on the Mumbai-Chennai main line with the hill station of Matheran in the Western Ghats, east of Mumbai. Neral is linked to Mumbai's Chhatrapati Shivaji Maharaj Terminus by frequent suburban trains. Steam engines have now been replaced by diesel locomotives. The route is noted for its sharp curves.

Divisions 
 Mumbai CR railway division
 Solapur railway division
 Bhusawal railway division
 Pune railway division
 Nagpur CR railway division

Organisation 
The central railway covers a large part of the state of Maharashtra and small part of Southern Madhya Pradesh and North-Eastern Karnataka. It is organized into five divisions: Mumbai, Bhusawal, Nagpur, Solapur and Pune. The details of the network by division are as follows

Mumbai Division 

 Mumbai CSMT-Dadar-Kurla-Thane
 Mumbai CSMT-Wadala Road-Kurla (Harbour Line)
 Wadala Road-Bandra-Goregaon (Inclusive)
 Kurla-Trombay (Goods)
 Kurla-Vashi-Nerul-Panvel (Harbour Line)
 Thane-Vashi-Panvel (Trans-Harbour line)
 Thane-Turbhe-Vashi (Trans-Harbour Line)
 Thane-Turbhe-Nerul (Trans-Harbour Line)
 Thane-Diva Jn-Kalyan
 Diva Jn-Panvel-Roha
 Panvel-Jasai-Uran
 Jasai-JNPT
 Diva Jn-Vasai Road
 Kalyan Jn-Kasara-Igatpuri (Inclusive)
 Kalyan Jn-Karjat Jn-Lonavala (Inclusive)
 Neral Jn-Matheran (narrow-gauge)
 Karjat Jn-Panvel
 Karjat Jn-Khopoli

Malshej Kriti Samiti is following for Kalyan-Ahmednagar railway project. Kalyan-Murbad section which is first phase of this project is already under survey stage.

Pune Division 

 Lonavala-Pune Jn-Daund Jn
 Pune Jn-Satara-Sangli-Miraj Jn-Kolhapur
 Daund Jn -Baramati
 Phaltan - Baramati ( to be completed by 2022)
 Pune Jn-Rajgurunagar-Sangamner-Sinnar-Nashik Road (Project Scrapped)
 Karad-Chiplun (scrapped)

Nagpur Division 

''
 Badnera Jn (Exclude)-Pulgaon Jn-Wardha Jn-Butibori Jn-Nagpur Jn
 Pulgaon Jn-Arvi (narrow-gauge)
 Butobori Jn-Umrer
 Sewagram-Majri Jn-Tadali Jn-Chandrapur-Balharshah Jn (include)
 Wardha Jn-Chitoda Jn (on Sewagram-Balharshah line)
 Majri Jn-Wani Jn-pimpalkutti
 Wani Jn-Rajur
 Tadali Jn-Ghugus
 Balharshah Jn-Chanda Fort
 Nagpur-Amla Jn-Itarsi Jn (exclude)
 Amla Junction-Chhindwara(exclude)
 Nagpur-sevagram-majri jn Balharshah

Solapur Division 

 Manmad (exclude)-Ahmednagar-Daund Jn
 Daund Jn-Solapur
 Miraj Jn (exclude)-Pandharpur-Kurudwadi Jn-Barshi-Latur-Latur Road (excluding)
 SolapurJn-Hotgi Jn-Gulbarga-Wadi Jn (Include)

Bhusawal Division 

 Manmad-Indore (project scrapped)
 Bhusawal-Badnera-Nagpur (exclude)
 Bhusawal-Khandwa-Itarsi (exclude)
 Jalgaon-Nandurbar-Udhna (exclude)
 Chalisgaon-Dhule
 Khamgaon - Jalamb 
 Pachora-Jamner
 Manmad-Aurangabad (exclude)
 Manmad-Daund (exclude)
 Mandmad-Nasik-Igatpuri (exclude)
 Akola-Nanded (exclude)

The number of stations category-wise under these five railway divisions under the Central Railway Zones are as follows (as of 2008) :
A-1 : 7, A : 20, B :  10, C : 80, D : 45, E : 221, F : 93, Total :  476

Ongoing Projects

New lines 
Solapur Jn -Tuljapur- Osmanabad. (New Rail Line survey completed but work yet to start)
 Ashti-Parli Vaijnath line (work under progress). Ahmednagar-Ashti 67 km completed. (Project :- Ahmedanagar- Beed - Parli)
 Phaltan - Baramati (approved, but work yet to start)
 Kolhapur-Vaibhavwadi line (survey under progress)
 Aurangabad-Shani shingnapur-Ahmednagar line (survey completed, but work yet to start)
 Khamgaon-Jalna (survey completed, but work yet to start) 
 Latur-Latur Road-Ahmedpur-Nanded (survey completed, but work yet to start)
 Latur Road-Jalkot-Mukhed-Biloli-Bodhan (announced but not yet taken up)
 Latur-Ausa-Nilanga-Omerga-Aland-Gulbarga (survey under progress)

Doubling 
 Bhigvan-Vakav (Earth work started)
 Tilati-Gulbarga (Earth work started)
 Pune-Miraj-Londa-Hubli (Doubling in progress)
 Pune-Miraj-Kolhapur (Doubling in progress)
 Panvel-Karjat
 Karjat-Khopoli

Tripling 
 Kalyan-Kasara
 Kalyan-Karjat
 Sewagram Jn-Balharshah Jn

Quadrupling 
 Nagpur-Wardha
 Jalgaon-Bhsawal
 Manmad-Igatpuri

Hexupling 
 Mumbai CSMT-Kalyan

Trains 

Some of the major trains operated by Central Railway zone are as follows:

Loco Sheds 
 Electric Loco Shed, Ajni
 Electric Loco Shed, Kalyan
 Electric Loco Shed, Bhusawal
 Diesel Loco Shed, Pune
 Diesel Loco Shed, Kalyan
 Diesel Loco Shed, Kurla
 Electric Loco Shed, Daund (Under Construction)

See also 
 All India Station Masters' Association (AISMA)
 Zones and divisions of Indian Railways
 Mumbai Suburban Railway
 Indian Railways
 Carriage Repair Workshop, Lower Parel, Mumbai

References

External links 
 Bhusawal Division
 Central, Western and Harbour railway timetable
 CENTRAL Railway local Train Timetable
 Detailed Mumbai Local Train Time Table
 / Mumbai Local Railways Latest Vacancies

Zones of Indian Railways
 
1951 establishments in Bombay State
Railways